Mountain Empire Airport  is a public use airport in Smyth County, Virginia, United States. The airport is situated between Interstate 81 and U.S. Route 11 (Lee Highway), near Groseclose. It is owned by Smyth Wythe Airport Commission.

This airport is included in the National Plan of Integrated Airport Systems for 2011–2015, which categorized it as a general aviation facility. Although many U.S. airports use the same three-letter location identifier for the FAA and IATA, this airport is assigned MKJ by the FAA but has no designation from the IATA (which assigned MKJ to Makoua Airport in Makoua, Republic of the Congo).

Facilities and aircraft 

For the 12-month period ending June 30, 2009, the airport had 10,405 aircraft operations, an average of 28 per day: 98% general aviation and 2% military. At that time there were 25 aircraft based at this airport: 92% single-engine, 4% multi-engine, and 4% helicopter.

References

External links 
 Aerial image as of April 1999 from USGS The National Map
 

Airports in Virginia
Buildings and structures in Smyth County, Virginia
Transportation in Smyth County, Virginia